George Mason University (George Mason, Mason, or GMU) is a public research university in Fairfax County, Virginia, with an independent City of Fairfax postal address in the Washington metropolitan area. The university was originally founded in 1949 as a Northern Virginia regional branch of the University of Virginia. Named after Founding Father of the United States George Mason in 1959, it became an independent university in 1972. The school has since grown into the largest public university in the Commonwealth of Virginia. Mason operates four campuses in Virginia (Fairfax, Arlington, Front Royal, and Prince William), as well as a campus in Incheon, South Korea. The flagship campus is in Fairfax.

The university is classified among "R1: Doctoral Universities – Very high research activity". Two professors were awarded the Nobel Memorial Prize in Economics during their time at George Mason University: James M. Buchanan in 1986 and Vernon L. Smith in 2002.

EagleBank Arena, a 10,000-seat arena and concert venue operated by the university, is located on the Fairfax campus. The university recognizes 500 student groups as well as 41 fraternities and sororities.

History

1949–1972

In 1949, the University of Virginia created an extension center to serve Northern Virginia. The extension center offered both for credit and non-credit informal classes in the evenings at various pre-existing venues. The first for credit classes offered were: "Government in the Far East, Introduction to International Politics, English Composition, Principles of Economics, Mathematical Analysis, Introduction to Mathematical Statistics, and Principles of Lip Reading."  By the end of 1952, enrollment was 1,192 students.

A resolution of the Virginia General Assembly in January 1956 changed the extension center into University College, the Northern Virginia branch of the University of Virginia. John Norville Gibson Finley served as director. Seventeen freshmen students attended classes at University College in a small renovated elementary school building in Bailey's Crossroads starting in September 1957. In 1958 University College became George Mason College.

The City of Fairfax purchased and donated  of land just south of the city limits to the University of Virginia for the college's new site, which is now referred to as the Fairfax Campus. In 1959, the Board of Visitors of the University of Virginia selected a permanent name for the college: George Mason College of the University of Virginia. The Fairfax campus construction planning that began in early 1960 showed visible results when the development of the first  of Fairfax Campus began in 1962. In the Fall of 1964 the new campus welcomed 356 students.

During the 1966 Session of the Virginia General Assembly, Alexandria delegate James M. Thomson, with the backing of the University of Virginia, introduced a bill in the General Assembly to make George Mason College a four-year institution under the University of Virginia's direction. The measure, known as H 33, passed the Assembly easily and was approved on March 1, 1966, making George Mason College a degree-granting institution. During that same year, the local jurisdictions of Fairfax County, Arlington County, and the cities of Alexandria and Falls Church agreed to appropriate $3 million to purchase land adjacent to Mason to provide for a  Fairfax Campus with the intention that the institution would expand into a regional university of major proportions, including the granting of graduate degrees.

George Mason University (1972–present)

In 1972, Virginia separated George Mason College from the University of Virginia at Charlottesville and renamed it George Mason University.
In 1978, George W. Johnson was appointed to serve as the fourth president. Under his eighteen-year tenure, the university expanded both its physical size and program offerings at a tremendous rate. Shortly before Johnson's inauguration in April 1979, Mason acquired the School of Law and the new Arlington Campus. The university also became a doctoral institution. Toward the end of Johnson's term, Mason would be deep in planning for a third campus in Prince William County at Manassas. Major campus facilities, such as Student Union Building II, EagleBank Arena, Center for the Arts, and the Johnson Learning Center, were all constructed over the course of Johnson's eighteen years as University President. Enrollment once again more than doubled from 10,767 during the fall of 1978 to 24,368 in the spring of 1996.

Dr. Alan G. Merten was appointed president in 1996. He believed that the university's location made it responsible for both contributing to and drawing from its surrounding communities—local, national, and global. George Mason was becoming recognized and acclaimed in all of these spheres. During Merten's tenure, the university hosted the World Congress of Information Technology in 1998, celebrated a second Nobel Memorial Prize-winning faculty member in 2002, and cheered the Men's Basketball team in their NCAA Final Four appearance in 2006. Enrollment increased from just over 24,000 students in 1996 to approximately 33,000 during the spring semester of 2012, making Mason Virginia's largest public university and gained prominence at the national level.

Dr. Ángel Cabrera officially took office on July 1, 2012. Both Cabrera and the board were well aware that Mason was part of a rapidly changing academia, full of challenges to the viability of higher education. In a resolution on August 17, 2012, the board asked Dr. Cabrera to create a new strategic vision that would help Mason remain relevant and competitive in the future. The drafting of the Vision for Mason, from conception to official outline, created a new mission statement that defines the university.

On March 25, 2013, university president Ángel Cabrera held a press conference to formally announce the university's decision to leave the Colonial Athletic Association to join the Atlantic 10 Conference (A-10). The announcement came just days after the Board of Visitors' approval of the university's Vision document that Dr. Cabrera had overseen. Mason began competition in the A-10 during the 2013–2014 academic year, and Mason's association with the institutions that comprise the A-10 started a new chapter in Mason athletics, academics, and other aspects of university life.  The Chronicle of Higher Education listed Mason as one of the "Great Colleges to Work For" from 2010 to 2014. The Washington Post listed Mason as one of the "Top Workplaces" in 2014. The WorldatWork Alliance for Work-Life Progress awarded Mason the Seal of Distinction in 2015. The AARP listed Mason as one of the Best Employers for Workers Over 50 in 2013. Phi Beta Kappa established a chapter at the university in 2013.

In 2018, a Freedom of Information Act lawsuit revealed that conservative donors, including the Charles Koch Foundation and Federalist Society, were given direct influence over faculty hiring decisions at the university's law and economics schools. GMU President Ángel Cabrera acknowledged that the revelations raised questions about the university's academic integrity and pledged to prohibit donors from sitting on faculty selection committees in the future.

Dr. Ángel Cabrera resigned his position on July 31, 2019, and became president of Georgia Tech. Following Cabrera's resignation, Anne B. Holton served as interim president until June 30, 2020.

On February 24, 2020, the Board of Visitors appointed Gregory Washington as the eighth president. He started at George Mason on July 1, 2020. Washington is the university's first African-American president.

On March 23, 2020, George Mason shifted to exclusively online instruction during the COVID pandemic.  Hybrid instruction occurred for the Fall 2020, Spring 2021, and Fall 2021 semesters. The university offered a combination of online and in-person instruction.

Campuses
George Mason University has four campuses in the United States, all within the Commonwealth of Virginia. Three are in the Northern Virginia suburbs of the Washington metropolitan area, and one is in Virginia's Blue Ridge Mountains. The university also has one campus in South Korea, in the Songdo International Business District of Incheon. Between 2005 and 2009 the university had a campus at Ras al-Khaimah, United Arab Emirates. The Blue Ridge campus, just outside Front Royal, is run in cooperation with the Smithsonian Institution.

Fairfax
Notable buildings include the  student union building, the Johnson Center; the Center for the Arts, a 2,000-seat concert hall; the  Long and Kimmy Nguyen Engineering Building; Exploratory Hall for science, new in 2013; an astronomy observatory and telescope; the  Art and Design Building; the newly expanded Fenwick Library, the Krasnow Institute; and three fully appointed gyms and an aquatic center for student use. The stadiums for indoor and outdoor track and field, baseball, softball, tennis, soccer and lacrosse are also on the Fairfax campus, as is Masonvale, a housing community for faculty, staff and graduate students.

Transportation 

This campus is served by the Washington Metro Orange Line at the Vienna-GMU station as well as Metrobus routes. This campus is served by the Virginia Railway Express Manassas Line at the Burke Center station. Fairfax Connector Route 306: GMU–Pentagon provides service to this campus. Mason provides shuttle service between this campus and Vienna, Fairfax, GMU Metro station, the Burke Center VRE station, the Science and Technology Campus, West Campus, and downtown City of Fairfax.

George Mason statue

The bronze statue of George Mason on campus was created by Wendy M. Ross and dedicated on April 12, 1996. The 7 foot statue shows George Mason presenting his first draft of the Virginia Declaration of Rights which was later the basis for the U.S. Constitution's Bill of Rights. Beside Mason is a model of a writing table that is still in the study of Gunston Hall, Mason's Virginia estate. The books on the table—volumes of Hume, Locke and Rousseau—represent influences in his thought.

Arlington
In 1998, Hazel Hall opened to house the George Mason University School of Law (now Antonin Scalia Law School); subsequent development created Van Metre Hall (formerly Founders Hall), home of the Schar School of Policy and Government, the Center for Regional Analysis, and the graduate-level administrative offices for the School of Business. Vernon Smith Hall houses the Jimmy and Rosalynn Carter School for Peace and Conflict Resolution, the Mercatus Center, and the Institute for Humane Studies. The campus also houses the 300-seat Founders Hall Auditorium.

Transportation 

This campus is served by the Washington Metro Orange Line at the Virginia Square-GMU station, a campus shuttle service, and Metrobus route 38B. The rail station is located one block west of the campus. Arlington Rapid Transit or ART Bus routes 41, 42, and 75 also provide service at this location. The campus offers one electric vehicle charging station, five disabled permit automotive parking locations, three bicycle parking locations, and one Capitol Bikeshare location.

Science and Technology campus 
More than 4,000 students are enrolled in classes in bioinformatics, biotechnology, information technology, and forensic biosciences educational and research programs. There are undergraduate programs in health, fitness and recreation. There are graduate programs in exercise, fitness, health, geographic information systems, and facility management. Much of the research takes place in the high-security Biomedical Research Laboratory. The 1,123-seat Merchant Hall and the 300-seat Verizon Auditorium in the Hylton Performing Arts Center opened in 2010.

The 110,000-square-foot Freedom Aquatic and Fitness Center is operated by the Mason Enterprise Center. The Mason Center for Team and Organizational Learning stylized as EDGE is an experiential education facility open to the public. The Sports Medicine Assessment Research and Testing lab stylized as SMART Lab is located within the Freedom center. The SMART Lab is most known for its concussion research. On April 23, 2015, the campus was renamed to the Science and Technology Campus.

In 2019, the university engaged in a feasibility study of creating a medical school at the Prince William Campus. The proposed medical school would be completed in 2022.

Smithsonian-Mason School of Conservation 

The campus in Front Royal, Virginia, is a collaboration between the Smithsonian Institution and the university. Open to students in August 2012 after breaking ground on the project on June 29, 2011, the primary focus of the campus is global conservation training. The Volgenau Academic Center includes three teaching laboratories, four classrooms, and 18 offices. Shenandoah National Park is visible from the dining facility's indoor and outdoor seating. Living quarters include 60 double occupancy rooms, an exercise facility, and study space.

Mason Korea (Songdo, South Korea) 
Opened in March 2014, the Songdo campus is in South Korea's Incheon Free Economic Zone, a  site designed for 850,000 people.

The Commonwealth of Virginia considers the Songdo campus legally no different from any other Mason campus, "... board of visitors shall have the same powers with respect to operation and governance of its branch campus in Korea as are vested in the board by the Code of Virginia with respect to George Mason University in Virginia ..."

Mason Korea's first commencement class graduated in December 2017. Students from Mason Korea earn the same diploma as home campus students, with English as the language of instruction.

Academics

Rankings

Mason offers undergraduate, master's, law, and doctoral degrees. The student-faculty ratio is 17:1; 58 percent of undergraduate classes have fewer than 30 students and 30 percent of undergraduate classes have fewer than 20 students.

Colleges and schools

College of Health and Human Services 
The college is located in the Peterson Family Health Sciences Hall on the Fairfax campus. Currently, the college is home to approximately 3,000 students. The college offers 5 undergraduate degrees, 12 graduate degrees, and 11 certificates. Academic programs in the college are accredited by the Association of University Programs in Health Administration (AUPHA), Commission on Accreditation for Health Informatics and Information Management Education (CAHIIM), and Commission on Accreditation of Healthcare Management Education (CAHME), Council on Education for Public Health (CEPH), Commission on Collegiate Nursing Education (CCNE), and Council on Social Work Education (CSWE).

Admissions
Between 2009 and 2013, George Mason saw a 21% increase in the number of applications, has enrolled 4% more new degree-seeking students, and has seen the percentage of undergraduate and graduate applications accepted each decrease by 4%. Law applications accepted increased by 10%. Mason enrolled 33,917 students for Fall 2013, up 956 (+3%) from Fall 2012. Undergraduate students made up 65% (21,990) of the fall enrollment, graduate students 34% (11,399), and law students 2% (528). Undergraduate headcount was 1,337 higher than Fall 2012 (+7%); graduate headcount was 262 lower (−2%); and law student headcount was 119 lower (−18%). Matriculated students come from all 50 states and 122 foreign countries. As of fall 2014, the university had 33,791 students enrolled, including 21,672 undergraduates, 7,022 seeking master's degrees, 2,264 seeking doctoral degrees and 493 seeking law degrees.

Enrollment 
As of 2017, the university enrolled 34,904 students, making it the largest university by head count in the Commonwealth of Virginia.

Accreditation
George Mason University is accredited by the Southern Association of Colleges and Schools (SACS) to award bachelor's, master's, and doctoral degrees.

Research
George Mason University hosts $149 million in sponsored research projects annually, as of 2019. In 2016, Mason was classified by the Carnegie Classification of Institutions of Higher Education among the U.S. universities that receive the most research funding and award research/scholarship doctorates. Mason moved into this classification based on a review of its 2013–2014 data that was performed by the Center for Postsecondary Research at Indiana University.

The research is focused on health, sustainability and security. In health, researchers focus is on wellness, disease prevention, advanced diagnostics and biomedical analytics. Sustainability research examines climate change, natural disaster forecasting, and risk assessment. Mason's security experts study domestic and international security as well as cyber security.

Centers and institutes
The university is home to numerous research centers and institutes.
 Center for Applied Proteomics and Molecular Medicine
 Center for Clean Water and Sustainable Technologies (CCWST)
 Center for Climate Change Communication (4C)
 Center for Collision Safety and Analysis
 Center for Excellence in Command, Control, Communications, Computing and Intelligence (C4I)
 Center for Humanities Research
 Center for Location Science
 Center for Neural Informatics
 Center for Peacemaking Practice
 Center for Real Estate Entrepreneurship
 Center for Regional Analysis
 Center for Social Complexity
 Center for Study of Public Choice
 Center for Neural Informatics, Structures, and Plasticity (CN3)
 Center for Well-Being
 Institute for Advanced Biomedical Research
 Interdisciplinary Center for Economic Science
 Krasnow Institute for Advanced Study
 Mercatus Center
 National Center for Biodefense and Infectious Diseases
 Roy Rosenzweig Center for History and New Media
 SMART Lab (Sports Medicine Assessment, Research & Testing)
 Stephen S. Fuller Institute

Student life

Traditions

Students will decorate the George Mason statue on the Fairfax campus for events, some rub the statue toe to bring good luck, and many pose with the statue for graduation photographs. Between 1988 and 1990 Anthony Maiello wrote the original George Mason Fight Song, which was edited by Michael Nickens in 2009.

Each spring, student organizations at Mason compete to paint one of the 38 benches located on the Quad in front of Fenwick Library. For years, student organizations have painted those benches that line the walkway to gain recognition for their group. With more than 300 student organizations, there is much competition to paint one of the benches. Painting takes place in the spring.

Housing

On the Fairfax campus the northernmost housing is technically on campus, but about a mile from the center of campus, about a half mile from the edge of the majority of the Fairfax campus in the housing area known as the Townhouses. On the eastern edge of the Fairfax campus lies Masonvale, houses intended for graduate students and visiting faculty. On the southern edge of the Fairfax campus you will find President's Park, Liberty Square, and Potomac Heights. On the western side of the Fairfax campus, near Ox Road/Rt 123, are the Mason Global Center, Whitetop, and Rogers. The Student Apartments off Aquia Creek Lane were torn down in 2019. Closer to the center of the Fairfax campus are the residence halls along Chesapeake Lane, named: Northern Neck, Commonwealth, Blue Ridge, Sandbridge, Piedmont, and Tidewater, as well as Hampton Roads, Dominion, Eastern Shore, and the Commons.

On-campus robot food delivery
George Mason University's Fairfax Campus is the first U.S. campus to include robot food delivery in its meal plans.  25 autonomous robots were provided by the Estonian robotics company Starship Technologies to carry out meal deliveries.

Student organizations

Student organizations can have an academic, social, athletic, religious/irreligious, career, or just about any other focus. The university recognizes 500 such groups.

Student media
Mason sponsors several student-run media outlets through the Office of Student Media.
 Fourth Estate: Website and weekly student newspaper, available on Mondays
 The George Mason Review:  A cross-disciplinary, undergraduate journal.
 Hispanic Culture Review: Publishes creative writing, book reviews, narratives, and essays in both Spanish and English. Published annually.
 Mason Cable Network: A television outlet run by the students, for the students, that provides analytical, and entertaining programming.
 Phoebe: A journal that annually publishes original works of literature and art.
 So to Speak: A feminist journal that publishes poetry, fiction, nonfiction, and visual art each semester.
 Volition: Formerly known as Apathy, is George Mason University's undergraduate creative literature and art magazine.
 WGMU Radio: Broadcasts a wide array of music, talk, sports, and news programming. WGMU is also the flagship station for George Mason's Men's and Women's Basketball team, part of the Go Mason Digital Network.

Greek life 
Mason has 42 fraternities and sororities recognized by the university, with a total Greek population of about 1,800. Mason does not have a traditional "Greek Row" of housing specifically for fraternities, although recruitment, charitable events—including a spring Greek Week—and other chapter activities take place on the Fairfax Campus.

Athletics

Division I teams

The George Mason Patriots are the athletic teams of George Mason University located in Fairfax, Virginia. The Patriots compete in Division I of the National Collegiate Athletic Association as members of the Atlantic 10 Conference for most sports. About 485 student-athletes compete in 22 men's and women's Division I sports – baseball, basketball, cross-country, golf, lacrosse, rowing, soccer, softball, swimming and diving, tennis, indoor and outdoor track and field, volleyball, and wrestling. Intercollegiate men's and women's teams are members of the National Athletic Association (NCAA) Division I, the Atlantic 10, the Eastern College Athletic Conference (ECAC), the Eastern Intercollegiate Volleyball Association (EIVA), the Eastern Wrestling League (EWL), and the Intercollegiate Association of Amateur Athletes of America (IC4A).

Intramural club sports
In addition to its NCAA Division I teams, George Mason University has several club sports.

Performing arts
The Mason Players is a faculty lead student organization that produces six productions. This season includes two "Main Stage" productions, which are directed by faculty members or guest artists. As well as "Studio" productions, which are directed by students through an application process within Mason Players. There is also an annual production of "Originals", which consists of 10 minute original plays written by students. Full time students of George Mason University, both outside and a part of the School of Theater are allowed to audition for these productions.

Controversies

Koch Foundation funding 
George Mason University has been subject to controversy surrounding donations from the Charles Koch Foundation. University documents revealed that the Koch brothers were given the ability to pick candidates as a condition of monetary donations. George Mason University altered its donor rules following the controversy.

Sexual misconduct 

In 2016 a male student won an appeal overturning his suspension for sexual assault.

The Title IX process (which investigates sex discrimination) at George Mason University has continued to be subject to controversy. Following the hiring of Brett Kavanaugh as a visiting professor in the law school in 2019, students circulated a petition demanding not only the removal of Kavanaugh, but to increase the number of Title IX Coordinators on campus. The petition received 10,000 signatures and resulted in approval for funding for two more Title IX Coordinator positions.

In 2018, Peter Pober was alleged to have committed sexual misconduct during his tenure as a Competitive Speech Coach. He retired while being investigated for misconduct.

Name of law school 
In 2016, George Mason's law school was briefly named the Antonin Scalia School of Law. Following the realization that this would lead to a vulgar acronym ("ASSLaw"), the school was quickly renamed to the Antonin Scalia Law School.

Notable faculty and alumni

Faculty 

 Vasily Aksyonov, Russian novelist, poet, and anti-totalitarian dissident, author of the "Generations of Winter," taught Russian literature at GMU during a period of exile in the 1980s-90s
Donald J. Boudreaux, economist, contributor of the Pittsburgh Tribune-Review and the Cafe Hayek blog, and author of the books Globalization and Hypocrites and Half-Wits
 James M. Buchanan, 1986 Nobel Memorial Prize winner for Economics
 Bryan Caplan, economist, blogger at EconTalk, author of The Myth of the Rational Voter and The Case Against Education.
 Tyler Cowen, economist, director of the Mercatus Center at Mason and founder of the blog Marginal Revolution
 Christopher d'Amboise, danseur, choreographer, Tony Award nominee.
 Helen C. Frederick, artist and printmaker
 Jack Goldstone, sociologist and political scientist specializing in revolutions; nonresident senior fellow at the Brookings Institution; 2014 winner of Guggenheim Award
 Hugh Heclo, political scientist, Guggenheim Fellow, and Clarence J. Robinson Professor of Public Affairs
 Jonathan Katz, cryptographer and co-author of Introduction to Modern Cryptography
 Brett Kavanaugh, Supreme Court Justice
 Emily W. Murphy, former GSA Administrator under Donald Trump.
 Steven Pearlstein, Pulitzer Prize winner for economics in The Washington Post
 Russ Roberts, economist and host of EconTalk
 Roy Rosenzweig, Fulbright scholar, historian, founded Center for History and New Media
 Louise Shelley, 2015 Andrew Carnegie Fellow from the Carnegie Corporation of New York.
 Martin Sherwin, Pulitzer Prize winner for his biography of Robert Oppenheimer
 Vernon L. Smith, 2002 Nobel Memorial Prize-winning economist.
 Gordon Tullock, co-founder of public choice economics.
 Roger Wilkins, Clarence J. Robinson Professor of History and American Culture, Pulitzer Prize winner, journalist, civil rights leader and former Assistant Attorney General of the United States
 Walter E. Williams, John M. Olin Distinguished Professor of Economics

Alumni 

 Abdiweli Mohamed Ali, President of Puntland and Prime Minister of Somalia
Bryon Allen (born 1992), basketball player for Hapoel Eilat of the Israeli Basketball Premier League
 Anousheh Ansari, Iranian-American engineer, co-founder of Prodea Systems and the first Muslim woman in space
 Justin Bour, former Major League Baseball player
 Callie Brownson, American football coach
 Anna E. Cabral, Treasurer of the United States under President George W. Bush
 Shawn Camp, former Major League Baseball player, current GMU interim baseball coach Toronto Blue Jays
 Kathleen L. Casey, Commissioner of the U.S. Securities and Exchange Commission
 Rabia Chaudry, Pakistani-American attorney, author of New York Times best-seller Adnan’s Story: The Search for Truth and Justice After Serial and podcast host
 Mike Colangelo, former Major League Baseball player
 Ken Cuccinelli, Senior Official Performing the Duties of the Deputy Secretary of Homeland Security under President Donald J. Trump, former Attorney General of Virginia and 2013 Republican nominee for Governor
 Carla Dove, ornithologist and leading expert of bird-aircraft strikes
 Mike Draper, former Major League Baseball player
 Chad Dukes, radio personality
 Erden Eruç, president and CEO of the non-profit Around-n-Over and the first solo human-powered circumnavigation of the globe
 Christine Fox, former Deputy Secretary of Defense. With her appointment, Fox became the highest-ranking woman to serve in the United States Department of Defense. She also served as the inspiration for the character Charlotte "Charlie" Blackwood in the film Top Gun
 Hala Gorani, anchor and senior correspondent for CNN International
 Jim Hagedorn, congressman from Minnesota's first congressional district
 Nikki Hornsby, Grammy Voting Recording Artist, Singer, Songwriter, Musician, Founder of CJP-NHRecords.com, carrying on the Hornsby Family Music Tradition Internationally.
 Elsa Jean, pornographic actress in the German adult film industry
 David Jolly, former member of the United States House of Representatives
 Jake Kalish, baseball player
 Archie Kao, actor best known for Power Rangers Lost Galaxy, Chicago P.D., and CSI: Crime Scene Investigation
 Steffen Kraus, German professional soccer player
 Carolyn Kreiter-Foronda, former Poet Laureate of Virginia
 Peter G. Levine, stroke recovery researcher, author of Stronger After Stroke.
 Cameron Long (born 1988), basketball player in the Israeli Premier League
 Jennifer Loud, nurse practitioner, medical researcher and former assistant chief of the National Cancer Institute's clinical genetics branch
 January Makamba, Tanzanian politician
 Jason Miskiri, former NBA player
 Darryl Monroe, professional basketball player, 2016 Israeli Basketball Premier League MVP
 Dayton Moore, president of the Kansas City Royals
 Sareh Nouri, Persian luxury bridal designer
 Chris O'Grady, former Major League Baseball player
 J. J. Picollo, general manager for the Kansas City Royals
 Steve Ricchetti, former Deputy Chief of Staff to President Bill Clinton
 Robert Rose, former NBA player
 Denise Turner Roth, Administrator of the U.S. General Services Administration (GSA)
 Karl Rove, former Deputy Chief of Staff to President George W. Bush
 Rhea Seehorn, actress best known for playing Kim Wexler on Better Call Saul
 Shawn Stiffler, head baseball coach of the Notre Dame Fighting Irish
 Martin Andrew Taylor, former senior executive Corporate VP of Windows Live and MSN, Chief of Staff to former Microsoft CEO Steve Ballmer
David Verburg, track and field athlete, 2016 Olympic gold medalist
Ian Weakley, Olympic hurdler
 Chris Widger, former Major League Baseball player Seattle Mariners, Chicago White Sox
 Ricky Wilson, former NBA player
Irad Young (born 1971), American-Israeli soccer player 
 Tyler Zombro, former Major League Baseball player

See also
 George Mason University's historical hoaxes
 Northern Virginia Community College

Explanatory notes

References

External links 

 

Educational institutions established in 1949
1949 establishments in Virginia
George Mason
Public universities and colleges in Virginia
Education in Fairfax County, Virginia
Universities and colleges in South Korea
Universities and colleges accredited by the Southern Association of Colleges and Schools
Education in Arlington County, Virginia
Education in Prince William County, Virginia
Education in Loudoun County, Virginia